The Hits is the first greatest hits album by American singer Kelis. It was released on March 1, 2008, by Jive Records and Legacy Recordings. It is Kelis's final release with both Jive and Virgin Records, before signing a recording contract with Interscope Records. The album contains no previously unreleased material.

Track listing

Notes
  signifies a remixer

Sample credits
 "Millionaire" contains excerpts from "La Di Da Di" by Doug E. Fresh and Slick Rick.
 "Finest Dreams" contains elements from "The Finest" by The S.O.S. Band and "The Things That Dreams Are Made Of" by The Human League.

Charts

Certifications

Release history

References

Further reading
  (Reprinted March 2008)

2008 greatest hits albums
Albums produced by André 3000
Albums produced by Bangladesh (record producer)
Albums produced by Dallas Austin
Albums produced by the Neptunes
Albums produced by Richard X
Albums produced by Rockwilder
Jive Records compilation albums
Kelis albums
Legacy Recordings compilation albums
Virgin Records compilation albums